Virginia's 5th congressional district election, 2010 was an election held to determine who would represent Virginia's 5th congressional district in the United States House of Representatives during the 112th Congress. The candidates were incumbent Democrat Tom Perriello, Republican state Senator Robert Hurt and Independent candidate Jeffrey Clark. Hurt narrowly defeated Perriello in the general election, 51% to 47%, with Clark receiving 2% of the vote.

Background

The seat being contested is located in Central and Southside Virginia. The district covers all or part of 18 counties and all of 4 independent cities, making it Virginia's largest district with an area of  - . larger than New Jersey. The 5th district has been represented by Democratic representative Tom Perriello since the 2008 election result, when he defeated Republican incumbent Virgil Goode by 727 votes, one of the closest elections in the nation.

The 5th congressional district was traditionally a conservative Democratic district. Incumbent Virgil Goode left the party to become an independent in 2000, and then a Republican two years later. In his 2008 defeat of Goode, Perriello out-performed the Democratic national ticket in the district, which Republican presidential candidate John McCain carried by 51% to 48%. In the previous two presidential elections George Bush won by 56% and 55%.

Goode did not seek a rematch against Perriello, although he said several Conservative groups asked him to run on a pro-Tea Party ticket, due to their dissatisfaction with the Republicans. Assembly line worker Bradley Rees filed to run as a Republican, then stated he would run on the Virginia Conservative Party ticket, and then suspended his campaign in 2009.

Republican primary
Hurt won the Republican nomination a seven-way primary on June 8, 2010, with results:

 Robert Hurt, State Senator, 48.42%
 James K. "Jim" McKelvey, from Franklin County, 25.89%
 Michael G. McPadden, 9.78%
 Kenneth C. Boyd, Albemarle County Supervisor, 7.37%
 Feda Kidd Morton, educator and Republican activist, 4.59%
 Laurence Paul Verga, private real estate investor, 2.26%
 Ron L. Ferrin, businessman, 1.64%

Candidates
 Tom Perriello, Democrat, incumbent U.S. Representative
 Robert Hurt, Republican, state Senator
 Jeffrey Clark, Independent

Polling

General election results

References

External links
Race ranking and details from CQ Politics
Campaign contributions from OpenSecrets
Race profile at The New York Times
Official campaign sites
 Feda for Congress
 Ferrin for Congress
 Hurt for Congress
 McKelvey for Congress
 McPadden for Congress 
 Perriello for Congress incumbent
 Verga for Congress
 Video: Perriello supporter gets violent

2010 Virginia elections